Nicholas the Small (Mikołaj Mały) (1322/1327 – 23 April 1358) was a Duke of Ziębice from 1341 until his death.

He was the only son of Duke Bolko II of Ziębice and his wife Guta. He was born between 1322 and 1327. He had a sister, Małgorzata, but he did not know whether she was older or younger.

Life
After his father's death on 11 June 1341, he took control of the government of his domains. He almost immediately went to Prague, where on 24 August he paid homage to King John of Bohemia. The huge debts left by his father forced Nicholas on 14 October 1343 to promise not to sell any of his lands without John's consent. In addition, if he did sell, the King had the first option to buy. He also agreed that, if the male line of the Dukes of Ziębice became extinct, the duchy would be annexed to the Bohemian Kingdom on condition that appropriate dowries be provided to the late Duke's daughters.

Financial problems as early as 1343 forced Nicholas to sell the district of Zobten (Sobótka) to his cousin Bolko II the Small for 1,000 grzywnas of silver. Three years later, and for the same amount, he sold Frankenstein (Ząbkowice) and the monastery of Kamenz (Kamieniec Ząbkowicki) to the Bohemian magnate Heinrich von Haugwitz. A combination of favorable circumstances enabled him to sell the same land in 1348, this time definitively, to Emperor Charles IV for 6,000 grzywnas. Finally, in 1350 Nicholas sold the town of Wąsów to the Bishop of Breslau, Przecław of Pogorzela. As a result, of the vast domains he inherited from his father, Nicholas retained only Münsterberg, Strehlen (Strzelin), Kanth (Kąty Wrocławskie) and Patschkau (Paczków).

In 1355, Nicholas took part in the coronation of Charles IV as Holy Roman Emperor in Rome. After a long stay in Prague, he returned to his duchy a year later. The Duke then went on a pilgrimage to Palestine between 1357 and 1358.

Nicholas died in Hungary on 23 April 1358 during his return trip. His body was brought to the duchy and buried in the monastery in Heinrichau.

Marriage and issue
By 23 October 1343, Nicholas married Agnes (d. 16 July 1370), daughter of  Hynek (also named Hermann or Hajman) Krušina z Lichtemburka, a Bohemian magnate. They had six children:
Ludmila [Anna?, Elisabeth?] (b. ca. 1344 – d. ca. 1372), married by 1360 to Duke Siemowit III of Masovia
Bolko III (b. ca. 1348 – d. 13 June 1410)
Henry I (b. ca. 1350 – d. aft. 8 August 1366)
Agnes (b. ca. 1351/53? – d. October 1434), Abbess of St. Klara, Strehlen
Guta (b. ca. 1354? – d. 2 September 1413), Abbess of St. Klara, Breslau (bef. 1380)
Katharina (b. ca. 1355/58? – d. ca. 1396), a nun in St. Klara, Strehlen.

In his will, Nicholas left to his wife the regency of his lands on behalf of their infant sons and effective rule over Strehlen.

References

External links
 
 
 Genealogical database by Herbert Stoyan
 Genealogy of the Dukes of Ziębice

1320s births
1358 deaths
Piast dynasty